Šidski Banovci railway station is a railway station on Novska–Tovarnik railway in Croatia. The station is operated by Croatian Railways, the state-owned railway company. It is located at the southern edge of the village of Banovci which itself was officially known as Šidski Banovci up until 1991. Historical local L213 line to Vukovar was passing on the eastern side on the village but is today out of use and in deteriorated condition.

On 19 January 2012 reconstruction of the Šidski Banovci railway station was completed. It was a part of reconstruction of nine railway stations on 67 kilometers route between Vinkovci and Tovarnik-Croatia–Serbia border funded from the Instrument for Pre-Accession Assistance of the European Union (48%) and Croatian Government (52%). Italian SALCEF Building Construction and Railway S.p.A. completed construction works valued 41.766.847,33 €, Italian branch of the Bombardier Transportation together with SITE SPA completed traffic signaling and traffic management system worth 16.411.114,98 € while the control over the works paid 2.005.000,00 € was completed by Spanish Técnica y Proyectos SA (TYPSA).

Gallery

See also
Orient Express which used the line on which the station is located.
Strizivojna–Vrpolje railway station (the location of murder in the Murder on the Orient Express)
Vinkovci railway station
Zagreb–Belgrade railway
Church of the Holy Venerable Mother Parascheva

References 

Railway stations in Croatia